Non-self may refer to:

 Anatta, in Buddhist philosophy, the "non-self" or "absence of separate self"
 The distinction of self from non-self, a central concept in Immunology proposed by Macfarlane Burnet
 Exogenous antigen, a non-self molecule that stimulates an immune response